Lighton may refer to:

 John Lighton Synge, Irish mathematician
 Louis D. Lighton, American screenwriter
 Lighton Baronets, a title in the Baronetage of Ireland